Cycling South Africa or Cycling SA is the national governing body of cycle racing in South Africa. Cycling SA is a member of the Confédération Africaine de Cyclisme and the Union Cycliste Internationale (UCI). It is affiliated to the South African Sports Confederation and Olympic Committee (SASCOC), as well as the Department of Sport and Recreation SA. Cycling South Africa regulates the five major disciplines within the sport, both amateur and professional, which include: road cycling, mountain biking, BMX biking, track cycling and para-cycling.

Cycling South Africa’s “2020 Vision” strategy, to cater for both the elite cyclist as well as the everyday two- and three-wheel lovers, contributes to the organisation being a dynamic, successful and highly respected governing body of cycling, at both national and international level. Cycling South Africa is committed to transformation and development of the sport and making it accessible to all via its development programmes.

References

External links
 Cycling South Africa official website

South Africa
Cycle racing organizations
Cycle racing in South Africa
Sports governing bodies in South Africa